John Byass (8 May 1854 – 6 June 1936) was an English cricketer. He played four first-class matches for Kent between 1874 and 1876.

References

External links
 

1854 births
1936 deaths
English cricketers
Kent cricketers
People from Upper Clapton
Cricketers from Greater London
Marylebone Cricket Club cricketers